Megophrys is a genus of frogs in the family Megophryidae. They are endemic to Indonesia, where they are found on the islands of Java and Sumatra. They commonly have elongated upper "eyebrows" and are thus known as Indonesian horned toads. This group was thought to contain many more species and have a much wider distribution prior to recent taxonomic revisions.

Taxonomy
The following species are recognised in the genus Megophrys:
 Megophrys acehensis 
 Megophrys lancip 
 Megophrys montana 
 Megophrys parallela 
 Megophrys selatanensis 

Additionally, two species are temporarily named as Megophrys, pending a determination of their correct genus placement.
 "Megophrys" dringi 
 "Megophrys" feii 
Megophrys formerly contained over a hundred species, but significant taxonomic revisions have led to the vast majority of these species being moved to other genera, such as Xenophrys, Boulenophrys, Atympanophrys and Pelobatrachus. However, there is a divide between studies over this, with most Indian-published studies preferring to classify all these taxa within Megophrys, while Chinese-published studies classify them in their own genera; the IUCN Red List follows the former, while Amphibian Species of the World and AmphibiaWeb follow the latter.

Endemic ranges
Many Megophrys species are endemic to highly restricted geographical areas.
Southern China
Anhui
 Megophrys huangshanensis: Huangshan mountains, Anhui
Guangdong
 Megophrys acuta: Heishiding, Fengkai County, Guangdong
 Megophrys obesa: Heishiding, Fengkai County, Guangdong
Jiangxi
 Megophrys cheni: Luoxiao Mountains
 Megophrys lini: Luoxiao Mountains
 Megophrys jinggangensis: Luoxiao Mountains
Hunan
 Megophrys sangzhiensis: Sangzhi County, Hunan
 Megophrys caudoprocta: Tianping Mountain, Sangzhi County, Hunan
 Megophrys tuberogranulatus: Tianzishan Nature Reserve, Sangzhi County, Hunan
 Megophrys mangshanensis: Yizhang County, Hunan
Chongqing
 Megophrys baolongensis: Baolong (抱龙镇), Wushan County, Chongqing
 Megophrys wushanensis: Wu Mountains, Chongqing
Yunnan
 Megophrys binchuanensis: NW Yunnan
 Megophrys daweimontis: Mount Dawei, Pingbian Miao Autonomous County, Yunnan
 Megophrys gigantica: Jingdong Yi Autonomous County and Yongde County, southwestern Yunnan
Sichuan
 Megophrys binlingensis: Binling, Hongya County, Sichuan
 Megophrys wawuensis: Mount Wawu, Hongya County, Sichuan
 Megophrys nankiangensis: northern Sichuan and southern Gansu
Guizhou
 Megophrys shuichengensis:  Fenghuang Village, Shuicheng County, Guizhou
Tibet
 Megophrys medogensis: Mêdog County, Tibet
 Megophrys zhangi: Zhangmu, Nyalam County, Tibet
Northeast India
 Megophrys megacephala: East Khasi Hills District, Meghalaya
 Megophrys oropedion: East Khasi Hills District, Meghalaya
 Megophrys vegrandis: West Kameng District, Arunachal Pradesh
 Megophrys ancrae: Changlang District, Arunachal Pradesh
 Megophrys serchhipii: Serchhip, Mizoram
 Megophrys zunhebotoensis: Nguti (Sukhalu), Zunheboto District, Nagaland
Cardamom Mountains, Cambodia
 Megophrys auralensis: Phnom Aural, Kampong Speu Province
 Megophrys damrei: Dâmrei Mountains, Kampot Province
Vietnam
 Megophrys latidactyla: Pù Mát National Park, Vietnam
Thailand
 Megophrys lekaguli: Chanthaburi and Sa Kaeo Provinces, eastern Thailand
 Megophrys takensis: Tak Province, Thailand
Borneo
 Megophrys baluensis: Sabah
 Megophrys dringi: Mount Mulu, Sarawak
Sumatra
 Megophrys parallela: West Sumatra
Philippines
 Megophrys ligayae: Balabac and Palawan
 Megophrys stejnegeri: Mindanao
Indonesia
 Megophrys montana: Java

References

External links
 Sound recordings of Megophrys at BioAcoustica

 
Megophryidae
Amphibians of Asia
Amphibian genera
Taxa named by Heinrich Kuhl